Jandola is the main town of Tank Subdivision (formerly known as "Frontier Region Tank") in southern Khyber Pakhtunkhwa, Pakistan. It is located at the boundary of South Waziristan. It has a population of 9,126 according to the 2017 Census of Pakistan. It also acts as the junction point that connects Tank-Makeen road with Tank-Wana road. Jandola is the origin of the Bettani tribe.

References

Populated places in Frontier Region Tank